The Emirates Hockey League (EHL) is the national ice hockey league of the United Arab Emirates. The league is governed by the International Ice Hockey Federation.  Founded in 2009 by the country’s Winter Sports Federation and the Emirates Olympic Committee, and licensed by the International Hockey Federation, the league now (2019) consists of six teams: the Abu Dhabi Scorpions, the Dubai Vipers/White Bears (previously Al Ain Vipers and Dubai Oilers), the Dubai Mighty Camels, the Abu Dhabi Storms, the Al Ain Theebs and the Abu Dhabi Shaheen Falcons. The Scorpions and Mighty Camels are composed of expatriate players, including Canadians, working in the U.A.E., while the other clubs consist of mostly Emirati players who form the United Arab Emirates national team.

The first game of the league was on October 7, 2009 between the Dubai Mighty Camels and the Abu Dhabi Scorpions, held at the Zayed Sports City in Abu Dhabi.

In November 2018, Vladimir Burdun, a former karate champion who had lived in Dubai since the mid-1990s, was appointed as the new president of the League. He planned to eventually field at least one Emirates team in the international, professional Kontinental Hockey League by 2021. "The main goal of the EHL management is to improve the quality of the league and bring new exposure to the level of play and create bridges with one of the best leagues in Europe, the Kontinental Hockey League (KHL)", he said. At about the same time, Dmitry Butenko was appointed as Managing Director of EHL. A new ice arena was expected to open in Dubai, possibly before the end of 2019, with a seating capacity of 17,000, and that venue would meet all the requirements of the KHL. (Preliminary plans for a major arena in Abu Dhabi were also underway in 2018.)

In April 2018, the Dubai Mighty Camels won the fourth title of Emirates Hockey League, becoming the major winner of the competition while in 2019, the champions were the Abu Dhabi Storms.

2021 season

Current teams

Former teams

Annual champions 

*The Al Ain Vipers became the Dubai Vipers in 2013, and changed their name to the Dubai Oilers in 2014.  The team changed back to Dubai Vipers for the 2016-2017 season.

References

External links
IIHF article on foundation of EIHL
2015/2016 Season Preview http://www.thenational.ae/sport/other/its-heating-up-in-the-uaes-ice-rinks-this-201516-season
2010 Season Preview http://www.khaleejtimes.com/sport/other/all-set-for-emirates-hockey-league-cup
2009 Season Preview http://www.thenational.ae/sport/uae-sport/a-guide-to-the-teams-in-emirates-hockey-league
NHL.com Hockey Finds an unlikely home in the Arabian Gulf https://www.nhl.com/news/hockey-finds-an-unlikely-home-in-arabian-gulf/c-615662

Ice hockey leagues in the United Arab Emirates
Sports leagues established in 2009
2009 establishments in the United Arab Emirates